Thomas Bourgeron is a French scientist working at the Institut Pasteur. The group he leads has discovered the first monogenic mutations involved in autism. He is member of the French Academy of sciences.

References

French biologists
French geneticists
French neuroscientists
Living people
Pasteur Institute
Year of birth missing (living people)
Members of the French Academy of Sciences